
Gmina Wieczfnia Kościelna is a rural gmina (administrative district) in Mława County, Masovian Voivodeship, in east-central Poland.

Villages
Gmina Wieczfnia Kościelna contains the villages and settlements of Bąki, Bonisław, Chmielewko, Chmielewo Małe, Chmielewo Wielkie, Długokąty, Grądzik, Grzebsk, Grzybowo, Grzybowo-Kapuśnik, Kobiałki, Kuklin, Kulany, Kulany-Kolonia, Łęg, Marianowo, Michalinowo, Pepłówek, Pepłowo, Pogorzel, Rukały, Turowo, Uniszki Gumowskie, Uniszki Zawadzkie, Uniszki-Cegielnia, Wąsosze, Wieczfnia Kościelna, Wieczfnia-Kolonia, Windyki, Żaki, Zakrzewo Wielkie, Zakrzewo-Froczki, Zakrzewo-Ranki, Załęże and Żulinek.

Neighbouring gminas
Gmina Wieczfnia Kościelna is bordered by the town of Mława and by the gminas of Dzierzgowo, Iłowo-Osada, Janowiec Kościelny and Szydłowo.

References

Polish official population figures 2006

Wieczfnia Koscielna
Mława County